Nevidimka is a rural locality (a khutor) in Kuybyshevskoye Rural Settlement, Sredneakhtubinsky District, Volgograd Oblast, Russia. The population was 35 as of 2010. There are 2 streets.

Geography 
Nevidimka is located 18 km southwest of Srednyaya Akhtuba (the district's administrative centre) by road. Chapayevets is the nearest rural locality.

References 

Rural localities in Sredneakhtubinsky District